Nathan Chappell (born 4 December 1989) is an English professional rugby league footballer who plays for Hunslet in Betfred League 1.

Previous clubs represented include the Featherstone Rovers, the Sheffield Eagles and Oldham.

He began his career at Newsome Panthers at the age of 7 where he played until he signed at the Huddersfield Giants aged 17. After 3-years at the club, 1 year at the Castleford Tigers, and a 2-year stint at the Featherstone Rovers, he moved to Australia to play in the Canberra Raiders Cup with the Goulburn Workers Bulldogs. He also represented the Canberra team. He played there for 2-years before returning to England where he signed for the Featherstone Rovers once again.

Chappell has arguably the fastest recorded hat-trick in rugby league (Featherstone v York, minutes 73–78), along with old teammate Greg Eden (Castleford v Leigh, minutes 33–38), which are both within a 5-minute period.

Chappell attended Newsome High School and Sports College.

References

External links 
 Oldham Sign Nathan Chappell
 Eagles Sign Nathan Chappell
 

1989 births
Living people
English rugby league players
Featherstone Rovers players
Hunslet R.L.F.C. players
Oldham R.L.F.C. players
Rugby league centres
Rugby league players from Huddersfield
Sheffield Eagles players